Hurley is an unincorporated community in Hardin County, Tennessee. Hurley is located near Shiloh National Military Park and is served by Tennessee State Route 22 and Tennessee State Route 142.

References

Unincorporated communities in Hardin County, Tennessee
Unincorporated communities in Tennessee